During the 1897–98 English football season, Brentford competed in the London League First Division. A hugely successful season saw the Bees win the London Senior Cup, the Middlesex Senior Cup and finish as runners-up in the league.

Season summary 

After winning promotion from the London League Second Division at the first attempt, the Brentford committee bolstered the team's firepower for its first season in the First Division by signing forwards Thomas Knapman, John Richardson and Ernest Booth. Goalkeeper Jack Foster, then one of the club's highest appearance-makers, elected to retire from football and Arthur Charlton, one of the club's first great players, moved to Nottingham and was succeeded as captain by Herbert Edney – though Charlton would return to play for Brentford sporadically through the season.

Brentford obliterated all opposition throughout the season, with the goals of forward Oakey Field providing the firepower to help the club win the London Senior Cup and the Middlesex Senior Cup. The pileup of London League fixtures meant that the Bees had to close the season with seven matches in just over three weeks, which included two matches in one day on 16 April. Brentford went into the final day of the season knowing that a victory over strugglers Barking Woodville would seal the league title, but the best the jaded team could manage was a 0–0 draw, which allowed Thames Ironworks, who won their final match, to finish the season as champions.

League table

Results
Brentford's goal tally listed first.

Legend

London League First Division

FA Cup

London Senior Cup

Middlesex Senior Cup

 Source: 100 Years of Brentford

Playing squad 

 "A. Bee" and "A. Newman" are aliases
 Source: 100 Years of Brentford

Statistics

Management

Summary

Notes

References 

Brentford F.C. seasons
Brentford